Treasure (Japanese: トレジャー; stylized in all caps) is a South Korean boy band formed in 2019 by YG Entertainment through the reality-survival program YG Treasure Box (2018–2019). The band consists of 10 members: Choi Hyun-suk, Jihoon, Yoshi, Junkyu, Yoon Jae-hyuk, Asahi, Doyoung, Haruto, Park Jeong-woo and So Jung-hwan. Former members Mashiho and Bang Ye-dam went on hiatus in May 2022 and departed from the band in November 2022. Treasure debuted in 2020 with the single album The First Step: Chapter One – the first in a tetralogy of albums that collectively sold over one million copies in five months.

History

2010–2019: Pre-debut activities and formation 

Junkyu, Bang Ye-dam and So Jung-hwan had stints in entertainment since childhood. Junkyu started as a child model whilst Bang recorded songs for animated shows and competed on K-pop Star 2 (2012–2013) and finished as runner-up behind Akdong Musician (AKMU). So briefly starred as a child actor and joined the Taekwondo demonstration team K-Tigers – where he won an award with the team. Mashiho had a cameo role in AKMU's Spring of Winter (2017) while Jihoon, Bang and Doyoung filmed for Stray Kids (2017) as trainees. Choi Hyun-suk and Junkyu competed on Mix Nine (2017–2018), finishing in fifth and thirty-fifth, respectively.

YG Entertainment documented Treasure's formation with a series aired simultaneously through JTBC2 and an internet network. YG Treasure Box (2018–2019) unveiled twenty nine male trainees in November and were gradually eliminated as the show progressed. The finale finalized the septet — Haruto, Bang Ye-dam, So Jung-hwan, Junkyu, Park Jeong-woo, Yoon Jae-hyuk and Choi Hyun-suk — under the name Treasure. The label revealed a second lineup of trainees — Ha Yoon-bin, Mashiho, Doyoung, Yoshi, Jihoon and Asahi — under the name Magnum in January 2019. The two aforementioned teams were collectively to be called Treasure 13; however, after Ha's departure from the label in December 2019 to pursue a solo career, Treasure and Magnum were merged into one permanent team named Treasure, the label's first boy band to debut since the launches of Big Bang, Winner and iKon.

2020–2021: Debut with The First Step tetralogy and Japanese debut 
In January 2020, Treasure was re-introduced to the public with weekly pictorials and performance videos, which included the single "Going Crazy" (미쳐가네; michyeogane) from YG Treasure Box (2018–2019), to which label-mate Mino of Winner contributed in production, alongside variety programs on YouTube such as Treasure Map and T.M.I. The label expressed their intent to use BigBang as a blueprint: "Treasure is planning to release new songs 3~4 times until the end of the year [...] it's a similar promotion method of how Big Bang released single albums every month when they first made debut back in 2006". Ahead of debut, Treasure became the fastest Korean act to chart on the Billboard Social 50 and peaked at number 3 on August 29. Bang also became the band's first member to release solo content with the digital single, "Wayo" (왜요; waeyo) on June 5. Broadcast promotions were not carried out due to his focus on preparations for debut with Treasure. Notably, label-mates Kang Seung-yoon of Winner and Lee Chan-hyuk of AKMU participated in its production. "Wayo" peaked at number 10 on the Billboard World Digital Song Sales chart and entered the Billboard Korea K-pop Hot 100 chart at number 98.

Treasure debuted on August 7, 2020 with the single album The First Step: Chapter One, the first installment of The First Step series. It amassed over 170,000 pre-orders several days ahead of the physical release on August 13. Its lead single, "Boy", found commercial success in Japan, topping music streaming platforms such as Line Music, Rakuten and the AWA rising chart. The music video for "Boy" surpassed 10 million views in 26 hours and 20 million views in six days on YouTube, eventually becoming Treasure's first to reach 100 million views on the platform. Treasure began promotions on August 9 with their first broadcast appearance on SBS' Inkigayo. The single album itself was certified platinum by the Korea Music Content Association (KMCA),  the group's first ever certification. The second installment to The First Step series was released on September 18. Its lead single "I Love You" (사랑해; saranghae) topped the monthly chart of Rakuten Music for the month of September with less than two weeks of tracking. The group also acquired the title "Half a Million Seller" as a result of the total album sales figures and earned their second platinum certification from the KMCA. The third installment, which was released on November 6, included the B-side single "Orange" (오렌지; olenji), which was the group's first self-produced song by member Asahi. Treasure surpassed 710,000 sales in three months since their debut. On November 28, the group won their first Rookie of the Year at the Asia Artist Awards. Concluding The First Step series, Treasure released their first studio album on January 11, 2021. It marked their third number one on the Gaon Weekly Album Chart and peaked atop the Gaon Monthly Album Chart for the month of January. The series ended with over one million copies sold, making Treasure a "Million Seller".

Treasure lent their voices to the soundtrack of the TV Tokyo Japanese anime Black Clover for the series' 13th ending theme song. First revealed on January 5, 2021 through the anime itself, the song also served as the group's first original Japanese release. It was digitally released on music streaming platforms as multiple versions on January 22 and February 14, respectively. The full version of "Beautiful" entered the Billboard Japan Hot 100 chart at number 58 and the Billboard World Digital Song Sales chart at number 23. In commemoration of the final episode of the show, the full version of "Beautiful" was played at the request of the director of Black Clover'''s last episode. Treasure's Japanese debut album, sharing a title with their first Korean studio album, was released on March 31 with an accompanying music video for their single "Beautiful". It included the Japanese versions of all their Korean releases to date, alongside their newest single. The album debuted and consecutively charted at number one for four days on the Oricon Daily Chart and debuted atop the Oricon Weekly Album Chart with 57,000 sales in its first week. On April 2, Treasure made their Japanese television debut on the Nippon TV music program Buzz Rhythm, where they performed the Japanese version of "Boy". On October 2, Treasure held their first "private stage", a fan meeting called Teu-day. The event took place at the Olympic Hall in Olympic Park. Due to COVID-19 guidelines and restrictions, venue tickets were limited, and cheering was prohibited in favor of stomping and clapping. Teu-day was also simultaneously broadcast online to those who purchased a ticket and was streamed in 100 countries.

 2022: The Second Step series and reformation 

YG Entertainment revealed a prelude of "The Second Step" on New Year's Day. The group's first extended play (EP), The Second Step: Chapter One, surpassed 600,000 copies in pre-orders by eight days time and was eventually released on February 15, 2022. The music video of its lead single, "Jikjin" (직진), acquired a ₩500 million ($420,000) investment by the band's label and accumulated 10 and 20 million views in 21 hours and under three days, respectively, on YouTube, both career highs for the group. Its view count rose five times faster than previous releases. The Second Step: Chapter One sold 700,000 copies in three days after its release, also a personal best. On February 24, Treasure received their first-ever music show win on the cable network program, Show Champion with "Jikjin". The b-side, "Darari", from the extended play found success on the platform TikTok as part of a challenge which reached 500 million views with over 1 million uploads. Treasure released the sophomore extended play, The Second Step: Chapter Two with its titular single, "Hello" on October 4.

The band's first Japanese EP, with the same title as their first Korean-language EP, was released on March 23, 2022.

On November 8, Bang Ye-dam and Mashiho were announced to depart as members of the band following their hiatus in May to pursue extended studies in music production and recuperate in health respectively.

 Other ventures 
 Endorsements 
In August 2020, the group collaborated with global creative studio Line Friends in the participation of designing new character intellectual properties (IPs). The product, later revealed to be branded as TRUZ, was presented in various forms, including messenger stickers, music sources, shots animation, character products and more. Augmented reality (AR) filters were also launched through Instagram. On April 29, 2021, TRUZ's newest doll collection sold out domestically in one minute through the official smart store, while the items were sold out in under an hour in 18 countries overseas, including those in Asia, South America and North America.

Treasure became models for the naturalist cosmetics brand Manyo Factory in January 2021. The brand achieved its highest sales through a mobile live broadcast on CJ Olive Young following the group's product recommendations to its viewers. That same year, Treasure became brand ambassadors for Ruangguru, an Indonesian educational learning platform, and models for I'mmune, an aloe immune health functional food by Univera, and its brand campaign "'Cultivating a Happy Immune Habit".

 Philanthropy 
Members of Treasure participated in labelmate Sean of Jinusean's charity marathon event Miracle 365 in July, August, October and November 2019. Awareness and funds were raised to build a rehabilitation hospital for children who require medical treatment caused by disability.

On July 5, 2020, members of Treasure participated in a volunteering program organized by YG Entertainment through Blue Angel Volunteers at an animal shelter in the Gyeonggi Province. A total of 33 YG Family staff members and labelmates contributed to the program. Volunteering activities included creating shelters, cleaning, restocking feed supply and more. That same year, in September, Treasure became advocates for children diagnosed with cancer. Through a partnership with YG Entertainment and Muju YG Foundation, the group encouraged individuals to help make a difference by donating via the Naver platform Happy Bean. On March 19, 2021, YG Entertainment announced that Treasure, alongside Muju YG Foundation and Um Hong-gil Human Foundation, participated in opening a human school support fund through Naver's Happy Bean to help the construction of schools for children and adolescents in Nepal's underprivileged areas. In addition, Muju YG Foundation donated 100 million won to the fund. In April, the group used their social media platforms to advocate for the 51st Earth Day. They voiced concerns on environmental problems, including climate change, and promoted the three action words interest, participation and consistency to better express how to tackle on these issues.

Artistry
Influences
Through the band's debut press conference, they stated their main role model and influence towards their careers were their labelmate seniors under YG Entertainment through their various music releases and videos.

 Members 
Adapted from their YGEX official website

 Current 
 Choi Hyun-suk – leader, rapper, dancer
 Jihoon – leader, vocalist, dancer
 Yoshi – rapper
 Junkyu – vocalist
 Yoon Jae-hyuk – vocalist
 Asahi – vocalist
 Doyoung – vocalist, dancer
 Haruto – rapper
 Park Jeong-woo – vocalist
 So Jung-hwan – vocalist, dancer

 Former 
 Mashiho – vocalist, dancer
 Bang Ye-dam – vocalist

 Timeline 

Discography

 The First Step: Treasure Effect (2021)

 Filmography 
 Television shows 
 YG Treasure Box (2018, V Live / YouTube / JTBC2)
 Treasure Map (2020–present, YouTube / SBS MTV / SBS FiL)

 Web shows 
 T.M.I (Treasure Maker Interaction) (2020–present, YouTube / V Live)
 Fact Check (2020, YouTube / V Live)
 3-Minute Treasure (2020, YouTube / V Live)
 T-Talk (2020, YouTube / V Live) 
 Treasure Studio (2020–2021, YouTube)
 Find Your Korea (2021, YouTube)
 TMI Log (2021–present, YouTube)

 Web series 
 It's Okay, That's Friendship (2021, YouTube)
 The Mysterious Class''  (2021, YouTube)

Tours and concerts

Tours

Concerts

Awards and nominations

Other accolades

Listicles

Notes

References

External links 

  

Treasure (band)
K-pop music groups
Musical groups established in 2019
South Korean boy bands
South Korean dance music groups
South Korean hip hop groups
YG Entertainment artists
Musical groups from Seoul
2019 establishments in South Korea